Texnikoi was founded in  as an honorary organization for students in the College of Engineering at Ohio State University. Its purpose is to give due recognition to those members of the College of Engineering who have distinguished themselves as campus leaders while maintaining, at the same time, a commendable scholastic record.

Texnikoi Engineering Honorary allows for only 25 new inductees each year, from a variety of the engineering specializations. To be considered for membership, he/she must be an engineering student at The Ohio State University, with an above-average cumulative GPA and a status of at least Sophomore. Members are then chosen by the amount and level of extra-curricular activity they participate in. Applications for membership are reviewed annually in early November.

Values
The three main values of Texnikoi are:

PARTICIPATION in activities
LEADERSHIP in organizations
SERVICE to the University and the community

Through Texnikoi’s emphasis on leadership and participation, it has always been able to select the top quality engineering students. The number of activities participated in by a student is not necessarily indicative of his/her qualification for membership in this fraternity, but rather the manner in which he/she has assumed active leadership, administrative ability, and integrity.

History

Founding
At the time that this organization was founded, a number of the students felt that some effort should be made to recognize outstanding work in the extra-curricular field.

 Other Notable Founders - Peter B. Baggs, Edward Burkhalter, Jesse R. Glaeser, Richard R. Grant, Charles L. Lockett, Howard L. Matthews, Donald F. McChurchy, George R. Miller, Loren A. Murphy, Herman F. Nofer, Albert Ward Ross, Jr., Hoyt L. Sherman, Edmund D. Watts, Rolland P. Wood, and Clarence T. Woodward.

Endowment
Even as the founder of Sakrete and the inventor of the bagged concrete industry, Avril never forgot about his roots.  In 1989 he raised close to $250,000 for the Texnikoi organization by auctioning off his 1954 Mercedes Benz 300SL Gullwing. It is this donation that has allowed for the thousands of dollars in scholarships awarded to outstanding members each year, and for the coverage of operating expenses of the honorary.

Symbols and Traditions
Meetings - Texnikoi holds meeting once a month during the regular school year.  Meetings serve two purposes: i) to inform members of the upcoming service, philanthropy, and social events, and ii) to allow engineers to meet other engineers and create a social network.

Plaques - The Texnikoi plaque is a hand crafted representation of the Texnikoi symbol.  At the beginning of every initiation period, members are instructed to make a plaque to represent the symbol of Texnikoi.  Initiates are only given an unfinished die cast of the 'TNK' symbol and criteria as to which the aspects of the plaque must fall into.  Plaques are due before initiation and then given back to the newly initiated members as symbol of their membership.  Alumni who have lost their plaques may request a new one be made by contacting the current President or Adviser of Texnikoi.

Texnikoi Outstanding Alumni Award -  The Texnikoi Award was first presented in 1955 and has been given annually since then. The requirements of the recipient are as follows:

1. A person who has risen rapidly in the field of engineering.
2. A person who has made outstanding contributions through civic and social activities.
3. A person of approximately 40 years of age or under.
4. A person from one of the engineering departments not recognized in the recent past.

The precedence has been established that a department should not be considered for two years after one of their alumni receives the award.

Texnikoi Outstanding Alumni Award Recipients
Each year the active membership of Texnikoi selects one of the younger alumni of the College of Engineering as a recipient of the Texnikoi Outstanding Alumni Award. This award is based upon their achievements since graduation, evaluated in light of the objectives of Texnikoi.

References

Ohio State University
Organizations based in Ohio
Student organizations established in 1924
1924 establishments in Ohio